The Alto Braço River is a river of Santa Catarina state in southeastern Brazil. Some sources show its lower reaches as the Do Braço River; some say it retains its name until joining the Tijucas River.

See also
List of rivers of Santa Catarina

References

Rivers of Santa Catarina (state)